Temptation in the Summer Wind is a 1972 West German romantic comedy film directed by Rolf Thiele and starring Helmut Käutner, Yvonne Furneaux, and Paul Hubschmid.

Cast

References

Bibliography

External links 
 

1972 films
West German films
1972 romantic comedy films
German romantic comedy films
1970s German-language films
Films directed by Rolf Thiele
1970s German films